Podturn may refer to:

 Podturn, Rogaška Slatina, a village in the Municipality of Rogaška Slatina, eastern Slovenia
 Podturn, Mokronog-Trebelno, a village in the Municipality of Mokronog-Trebelno, southeastern Slovenia
 Podturn pri Dolenjskih Toplicah, a village in the Municipality of Dolenjske Toplice, southeastern Slovenia
 Tivoli Castle, originally named Podturn Manor, Ljubljana (the capital of Slovenia)